The flag of Wisconsin is the official flag of the U.S. state of Wisconsin. The flag was first adopted in 1863, and was modified in 1979. It is a blue flag charged with the state coat of arms of Wisconsin.

Flag design 

The state flag is officially described by law as:

History
The flag of Wisconsin was adopted in 1863, following requests from Civil War regiments for battlefield use. The legislature formed a committee to choose the specifications for the flag, which was the state coat of arms centered on a field of dark blue. This design was similar to the ones in use by regiments. In 1913, it was formally added to the Wisconsin Statues, which specified the design of the state flag.

In 1941, Carl R. Eklund reported that he raised the state flag over Antarctica, at the behest of Wisconsin Governor Julius P. Heil, about 500 miles north of the South Pole and 620 miles into a previously unexplored area. In 1958, Eklund flew another flag over Antarctica which he presented for display in a state museum. In 1953, state assemblyman William N. Belter of Wautoma criticized the flag as too costly because of the details.

In 1973, when the state senate was attempting to add the word Wisconsin to the flag, it was criticized as already too cluttered. In 1975, some state flags were being sold that improperly had the state seal on them instead of the state coat of arms. Wisconsin Secretary of State Douglas J. La Follette noted that the correct state flag did not have the banner of thirteen stars at the bottom.

In order to distinguish it from the many other blue U.S. state flags, Wisconsin's flag was modified in 1979 to add "Wisconsin" and "1848", the year Wisconsin was admitted to the Union. All Wisconsin state flags manufactured after May 1, 1981, were required to use this design.

Description 
The flag field is navy blue with the Wisconsin coat of arms in the center, and the words "Wisconsin" and "1848" above and below the seal in a bold white. On the top of the coat of arms, there is a badger, and the state motto "Forward". In the center, on the shield, there is a plow to represent farming, a pick and shovel to represent mining, an arm and hammer representing manufacturing, and an anchor representing navigation. In the center of the shield is the United States coat of arms. The shield is supported by a sailor and a yeoman, both representing labor on land and on water. On the bottom there is a cornucopia, representing prosperity, and there are 13 lead ingots representing both mineral wealth and the original 13 colonies of the United States.

See also
Symbols of the State of Wisconsin
Great Seal of the State of Wisconsin

References

External links
State of Wisconsin website
Wisconsin State Symbols

Wisconsin
Symbols of Wisconsin
Flags of Wisconsin
Wisconsin